Gorno Jabolčište is a village in the municipality of Čaška, North Macedonia.

Demographics
According to the 2002 census, the village had a total of 2.444 inhabitants. Ethnic groups in the village include:

Albanians 2.401
Others 33

References

External links

Villages in Čaška Municipality
Albanian communities in North Macedonia